Rockerboy is a supplement published by R. Talsorian Games in 1989 for the  dystopian near-future role-playing game Cyberpunk.

Contents
Rockerboy is a supplement that takes the form of a fictional lifestyle magazine. The contents include rules for backgrounds of Rockerboy characters, and appropriate equipment. Several miniscenarios are also included.

Publication history
Rockerboy was written by Colin Fisk, Will Moss, Scott Ruggels, David Ackerman, Glenn Wildermuth, Sam Shirley, and Mike Pondsmith, with interior art by Colin Fisk, Harrison Fong, Chris Hockabout, Mike Pondsmith, and Scott Ruggels, and cover by Doug Anderson, and was published by R. Talsorian Games in 1989 as an 80-page book.

Reception
In the June 1990 edition of Games International, the reviewer thought the presentation "lacks the slick colour production of FASA's Shadowrun supplements" but admired this product for its "accurately appalling Rolling Stone style interviews, reviews and adverts."

Other reviews
White Wolf #21 (June/July, 1990)
Windgeflüster Issue 27 (Oct 1994, p.31, in German)
GamesMaster International Issue 5 (Dec 1990, p.10)
Games Review Vol.2 Issue 7 (August 1990, p.28)

References

Cyberpunk (role-playing game) supplements
Role-playing game supplements introduced in 1989